In five-dimensional geometry, a 5-orthoplex, or 5-cross polytope, is a five-dimensional polytope with 10 vertices, 40 edges,  80 triangle faces, 80 tetrahedron cells, 32 5-cell 4-faces.

It has two constructed forms, the first being regular with Schläfli symbol {33,4}, and the second with alternately labeled (checkerboarded) facets, with Schläfli symbol {3,3,31,1} or Coxeter symbol 211.

It is a part of an infinite family of polytopes, called cross-polytopes or orthoplexes. The dual polytope is the 5-hypercube or 5-cube.

Alternate names
 pentacross, derived from combining the family name cross polytope with pente for five (dimensions) in Greek.
 Triacontaditeron (or triacontakaiditeron) - as a 32-facetted 5-polytope (polyteron).

As a configuration
This configuration matrix represents the 5-orthoplex. The rows and columns correspond to vertices, edges, faces, cells and 4-faces. The diagonal numbers say how many of each element occur in the whole 5-orthoplex. The nondiagonal numbers say how many of the column's element occur in or at the row's element.

Cartesian coordinates 
Cartesian coordinates for the vertices of a 5-orthoplex, centered at the origin are
 (±1,0,0,0,0), (0,±1,0,0,0), (0,0,±1,0,0), (0,0,0,±1,0), (0,0,0,0,±1)

Construction 

There are three Coxeter groups associated with the 5-orthoplex, one regular, dual of the penteract with the C5 or [4,3,3,3] Coxeter group, and a lower symmetry with two copies of 5-cell facets, alternating, with the D5 or [32,1,1] Coxeter group, and the final one as a dual 5-orthotope, called a 5-fusil which can have a variety of subsymmetries.

Other images

Related polytopes and honeycombs 

This polytope is one of 31 uniform 5-polytopes generated from the B5 Coxeter plane, including the regular 5-cube and 5-orthoplex.

References 

 H.S.M. Coxeter:
 H.S.M. Coxeter, Regular Polytopes, 3rd Edition, Dover New York, 1973
 Kaleidoscopes: Selected Writings of H.S.M. Coxeter, edited by F. Arthur Sherk, Peter McMullen, Anthony C. Thompson, Asia Ivic Weiss, Wiley-Interscience Publication, 1995,  
 (Paper 22) H.S.M. Coxeter, Regular and Semi Regular Polytopes I, [Math. Zeit. 46 (1940) 380-407, MR 2,10]
 (Paper 23) H.S.M. Coxeter, Regular and Semi-Regular Polytopes II, [Math. Zeit. 188 (1985) 559-591]
 (Paper 24) H.S.M. Coxeter, Regular and Semi-Regular Polytopes III, [Math. Zeit. 200 (1988) 3-45]
 Norman Johnson Uniform Polytopes, Manuscript (1991)
 N.W. Johnson: The Theory of Uniform Polytopes and Honeycombs, Ph.D. (1966)

External links 

 Polytopes of Various Dimensions
 Multi-dimensional Glossary

5-polytopes